Club de Fútbol Motril is a Spanish football club based in Motril, Granada, in the autonomous community of Andalusia (Spain).Founded in 2012 as a replacement for dissolved Motril CF, it plays in Tercera Federación – Group 9, holding home matches at Estadio Escribano Castilla, with a capacity of 5,400 seats.

History 
In 2012, after the disappearance of Motril CF, CF Motril was created. This begins to compete from the lower leagues of Spanish football, but achieved a meteoric rise. So much so that in the first four seasons of its existence it achieved four consecutive promotions, and already in the 2019–20 Season, it tried to make the jump to Second Division B through the play-offs, in which it would fail, eliminated by El Ejido in the semifinals by a score of 2-3.

In the 2020–21 season, it played the first edition of the RFAF Cup that gives access to the RFEF Cup, it could have also given a ticket to play the Copa del Rey, but they lost in the quarterfinals against Antequera CF. In 2020 they created the CF Motril Academy or CF Motril "B", which achieved its first promotion in the 2020–21 season to Segunda Andaluza. And in the year 2021 Nike noticed this club and became its official sponsor, apart from many others.

Season to season

5 seasons in Tercera División
2 seasons in Tercera Federación

References

External links
 
La Preferente team profile 
Soccerway team profile

Football clubs in Andalusia
Association football clubs established in 2012
2012 establishments in Spain